Baran Mogultay (born 18 May 2004) is a German professional footballer who plays as a left-back for MSV Duisburg.

Club career
Born in Ahlen, Mogultay passed through the academies of various clubs before joining MSV Duisburg in 2017 from Rot Weiss Ahlen. He signed his first professional contract in June 2022.

After making his debut in the Lower Rhine Cup, Mogultay made his 3. Liga debut against Halle in October 2022.

International career
Born in Germany, Mogultay is of Turkish descent. He has represented Germany at youth international level.

Club statistics

References

2004 births
Living people
People from Ahlen
Footballers from North Rhine-Westphalia
German footballers
Germany youth international footballers
German people of Turkish descent
Association football defenders
3. Liga players
Hammer SpVg players
Rot Weiss Ahlen players
MSV Duisburg players
21st-century German people